2001 England riots may refer to:

 2001 Bradford riots
 2001 Harehills riot
 2001 Oldham riots